The Czech Social Democratic Party (ČSSD) leadership election of 2003 was held on 30 March 2003. The incumbent leader Vladimír Špidla was re-elected.

His rivals were Jiří Rusnok, Jana Volfová and Josef Dobrý. Volfová and Dobrý withdrew from election before the voting started and endorsed Rusnok.

Candidates
 Vladimír Špidla, the incumbent leader of ČSSD and the Prime Minister of the Czech Republic
 Jiří Rusnok, former Minister of Finance

Declined
Stanislav Gross – Gross was rumoured to be a candidate. Some organisations proclaimed their support for his possible candidacy. He himself said that he would run for the position in 2006.

Results

References

2003
Social Democratic Party leadership election
Czech Social Democratic Party leadership election
Czech Social Democratic Party leadership election